The maharaja of Mysore was the king and principal ruler of the southern Indian Kingdom of Mysore and briefly of Mysore State in the Indian Dominion roughly between the mid- to late-1300s and 1950.

In title, the role has been known by different names over time, from poleygar (Kannada, pāLegāra, for 'chieftain') during the early days of the fiefdom to raja (Sanskrit and Kannada, king–of especially a small region) during its early days as a kingdom to maharaja (Sanskrit and Kannada, [great] king–of a formidable kingdom) for the rest of its period. In terms of succession, the successor was either a hereditary inheritor or, in case of no issue, handpicked by the reigning monarch or his privy council. All rulers under the Sanskrit-Kannada titles of raja or maharaja were exclusively from the house of Wadiyar.

As India gained Independence from British Crown in 1947, Crown allies, most of which were princely India, ceded into the Dominion of India by 1950. With that, the title and the role of maharaja was replaced with that of rajpramukh and soon governor.

Formation and abolishment 
While becoming more occupied with major fights in the late 1300s, the Vijayanagara emperor Harihara II started delegating protection of regions on the flanks of the empire to their respective local chieftains. Protection of the regions in and around present-day Mysore city fell on Yaduraya's shoulders, the Vijayanagara soldier stationed as a chieftain in the region at that time.

Poleygars and rajas 
Raja Chamaraja Wodeyar III, who ruled from 1513 to 1553 over a few villages not far from the Kaveri river, is said to have constructed a small fort and named it Mahisuranagara (Kannada for buffalo town), from which Mysore gets its name. However, earlier references to the region as mahishaka dating back to mythology and the Vedic period exist.

Maharajas 
With the fall and decline of the Vijayanagara Empire, Raja Chamaraja Wodeyar III's son and successor Maharaja Timmaraja Wodeyar II declared independence and assumed the title maharaja of Mysore. During the reigns of kings Kanthirava Narasaraja I and  Devaraja Wodeyar I, the kingdom saw great territorial expansion. In the latter half of the 18th century, during the sultanate of the Hyder Ali-Tipu father-son duo dictating the kingdom in succession, the maharajas went largely unrecognised or merely remained nominal rulers. After the fall of Tipu, British Crown restored the kingdom to the Wadiyars as maharajas.

Governor 
After India's constitution into a republic in 1950, the last ruling Maharaja Jayachamaraja Wadiyar ceded the kingdom into the republic. However, like most kings in India at that time, the maharaja and his successors were allowed an annual payment (the privy purse), certain privileges, and the use of the title "Maharaja of Mysore." Nevertheless, with the 26th Amendment to the Constitution of India, titles and privy purse all ended. With this, the role was replaced with Rajpramukh of Mysore, later renamed Governor of Mysore (now Governor of Karnataka). The role was thus incorporated into the democratic system, the governor being recommended by the Government of India and appointed by the President.

Maharajas 
The first raja (and poleygar) of Mysore was Yaduraya. The last ruling king was Maharaja Jayachamaraja Wadiyar. The current head of the Wadiyar family is Yaduveera Krishnadatta Chamaraja Wadiyar.

The reputation of the maharajas of Mysore has varied historically, ending, however with great reputation. Whereas for example Maharaja Kanthirava Narasaraja I was famous as a reckoning force, his nephew's great-great-grandson Maharaja Krishnaraja Wodeyar I was seen as weak and capricious. After the fall of Tipu, all maharajas have earned great adulation. Maharaja Krishnaraja Wodeyar III both actively and monetarily contributed to arts and culture; while Maharaja Chamaraja Wadiyar X spawned democratic practices, Maharaja Krishnaraja Wadiyar IV is praised for modernising Mysore Kingdom's economy and industries.

See also
 Governor of Karnataka
 List of maharajas of Mysore
 List of Governors of Karnataka
 Diwan of Mysore
 Wadiyar dynasty

Notes

Citations

Sources used

External links
 Virtual Tour of Mysore Palace
Kingdom of Mysore
.
People of the Kingdom of Mysore
Mysore
Karnataka